Chen Xing (born 29 March 2000) is a Chinese footballer currently playing as a midfielder for Meizhou Hakka.

Club career
Chen Xing would be promoted to the senior team of Meizhou Hakka and go on to make professional debut in a league game on 20 July 2019 against Guizhou Hengfeng in a 2-0 defeat. This would be followed by his first goal of his career on 26 October 2019 against Liaoning that ended in a 3-2 victory. He would be a squad player as the club gained promotion to the top tier after coming second within the division at the end of the 2021 China League One campaign. On 31 August 2022 he would be loaned out to second tier club Shaanxi Chang'an Athletic for the remainder of the season.

Career statistics
.

References

External links

2000 births
Living people
Chinese footballers
Association football midfielders
China League One players
Atlético Madrid footballers
Meizhou Hakka F.C. players
Chinese expatriate footballers
Chinese expatriate sportspeople in Spain
Expatriate footballers in Spain